Emilyano Lorensovich Ochagaviya (May 24, 1945 – February 7, 2016) was a  Soviet and Russian theater actor, Honored Artist of the RSFSR (1986), People's Artist of the Russian Federation (2000).

Biography 
He was born in  the village of Nei-colony Kamyshinsky District, Stalingrad Oblast to a father of Spanish Basque ancestry and an ethnic Georgian mother.

Graduated from the Leningrad State Institute of Theater, Music and Cinematography (Georgy Tovstonogov course). Creative activity was begun by him in the theater of twice heroic Baltic Fleet, and then worked in the drama theaters of Kaluga, Kemerovo, and Astrakhan.

Since 1977, he served in Ostrovsky Theatre in Kostroma, where he played many leading roles of classical and contemporary repertoire. In 1999-2003, he headed the theater.

Honorary Citizen of Kostroma Oblast (July 10, 2008).

Death
On Sunday evening, February 7, 2016 in the house on Myasnitskaya Street in Kostroma, where with his family the actor lived, a fire broke out. Firefighters managed to bring the actor, who was asleep, out of the apartment  at the time of the fire. However, Emilyano Ochagaviya soon died in hospital in Kostroma.

Filmography
2004 —  Moscow Saga as Galaktion Gudiashvili
2007 —  According to the Law of Attraction as old actor
2009 —  Isayev as episode
2009 —  Kotovsky as Prosecutor (uncredited)
2012 —  Solovey-Razboynik as old bandit

References

External links 
 
 Костромской драматический театр. Эмиляно Очагавия.
 КиноПоиск: Эмиляно Очагавия

1945 births
2016 deaths
Soviet male stage actors
Russian male film actors
Russian male stage actors
Russian male television actors
People's Artists of Russia
Honored Artists of the RSFSR
20th-century Russian male actors
21st-century Russian male actors
Russian people of Spanish descent
Russian people of Basque descent
Russian people of Georgian descent